Weite Straßen – stille Liebe is an East German film. It was released in 1969.

External links
 

1969 films
East German films
1960s German-language films
Films directed by Herrmann Zschoche
1960s German films